The Commonwealth Short Story Prize is awarded annually for the best piece of unpublished short fiction (2,000 to 5,000 words). The prize is open to citizens of member states of the Commonwealth of Nations aged 18 and over. The Commonwealth Short Story Prize is managed by Commonwealth Writers, the cultural initiative of the Commonwealth Foundation, which was set up in 2012 to inspire, develop and connect writers and storytellers across the Commonwealth. The Prize replaced the Commonwealth Short Story Competition, a roughly similar competition that existed from 1996 to 2011 and was discontinued by the Commonwealth Foundation, along with the Commonwealth Writers' Prize.

The Prize is open to writers who have had little or no work published and particularly aimed at those places with little or no publishing industry. The prize aims to bring writing from these countries to the attention of an international audience. The stories need to be in English, but can be translated from other languages.

The overall winner receives £5,000 and the regional winner £2,500. During 2012–13, the regional winner received £1,000. Starting in 2014, the award for regional winners of the Short Story Prize was increased to £2,500. At the same time, Commonwealth Writers discontinued the Commonwealth Book Prize and focused solely on the Short Story Prize.

Commonwealth Foundation
Commonwealth Writers is the cultural programme of the Commonwealth Foundation. The Commonwealth Foundation is an intergovernmental organisation established in 1965, resourced by and reporting to Commonwealth governments, and guided by Commonwealth values and priorities.

Winners

Regional winners and overall winners.

Judges 
In 2022 the judges were Fred D'Aguiar (Chair), Louise Umutoni-Bower (Judge, African Region) founder of Huza Press, Jahnavi Barua (Judge, Asian Region), Stephanos Stephanides (Judge, Canada and Europe Region), Kevin Jared Hosein (Judge, Caribbean Region) and Jeanine Leane (Judge, Pacific Region).

See also
Commonwealth Foundation prizes

References

External links
Commonwealth Short Story Prize, official site (Commonwealth Writers)

Awards established in 2012
Commonwealth Writers awards
Short story awards